The Goya Award for Best Special Effects (Spanish: Premio Goya a los mejores efectos especiales) is one of the Goya Awards, Spain's principal national film awards. The category was first presented at the second edition of the Goya Awards with Francisco Teres being the first winner of the award for his work in Anguish (1987).

Reyes Abades holds the record of the most wins for this category with nine wins followed by Félix Bergés with seven and Raúl Romanillos with six. For their work in Pan's Labyrinth (2006), David Martí and Montse Ribé won the Academy Award for Best Makeup and Hairstyling but competed and won alongside Emilio Ruiz del Río, Everett Burrell, Reyes Abades and Edward Irastorza in this category at the Goya Awards instead of Best Makeup and Hairstyles which was won by José Quetglas and Blanca Sánchez for the same film.

Winners and nominees

1980s

1990s

2000s

2010s

2020s

References

External links
Official site
IMDb: Goya Awards

Goya Awards